Diane Sharon Fordney ( Sept 28, 1940 - Sept 16, 2022) is an American physician  and sex therapist best known for her work on sexual function and dysfunction. She has also published professionally as Diane S. Fordney-Settlage.

Career
Fordney earned her BS in 1960 from University of Arizona and her M.D. in 1964 from University of California at Los Angeles. She later earned a M.S. in 1971 from University of California at Davis.

Her early work looked at mechanisms of sperm motility following intercourse. She also published findings about sexual experience among teen girls. In 1975 she wrote an overview of heterosexual dysfunction.

Fordney served as Assistant Professor, Obstetrics and Gynecology Division of Reproductive Biology at the Los Angeles County-USC Medical Center. She then took a position as Associate Professor of Obstetrics/Gynecology and Associate Professor of Psychiatry at the Medical School of the Stony Brook University.

Fordney was an early critic of gynecologist James C. Burt and his unconsented surgeries on the vulvas of patients: "Dr. Burt is a nice person but he is a zealot and that makes him dangerous." She served on the subcommittee on psychosexual disorders for the third edition of the Diagnostic and Statistical Manual of Mental Disorders

During her tenure at the University of Arizona Medical Center’s fertility clinic, Fordney assisted in helping hundreds of couples with fertility issues bring babies to term.

Selected publications

Fordney Settlage DS, Motoshima M, Tredway, DR (1973). Sperm transport from the external cervical os to the Fallopian tubes in women: A time and quantitation study. Fertil Steril. 1973 Sep;24(9):655-61.
DS Fordney Settlage, Baroff S, Cooper D (1973). Sexual experience of younger teenage girls seeking contraceptive assistance for the first time. Family Planning Perspectives, Vol. 5, No. 4 (Autumn, 1973), pp. 223–226
Fordney-Settlage DS (1975). Heterosexual dysfunction: Evaluation of treatment procedures. Archives of Sexual Behavior, Volume 4, Number 4 / July, 1975
Tredway DR, Umezaki CU, Mishell DR Jr, Settlage DS. Effect of intrauterine devices on sperm transport in the human being: preliminary report. Am J Obstet Gynecol. 1975 Dec 1;123(7):734-5.
Fordney DS (1978). Dyspareunia and vaginismus. Clin Obstet Gynecol. 1978 Mar;21(1):205-21.
Fordney-Settlage DS (1981). A review of cervical mucus and sperm interactions in humans. Int J Fertil. 1981;26(3):161-9.

References

External links
Diane S. Fordney listing via State of Arizona

1940 births
Living people
American obstetricians
University of California, Davis alumni
University of Arizona alumni
University of California, Los Angeles alumni